"The Next Step Is Love" is a song written by Paul Evans and Paul Parnes and originally recorded by Elvis Presley.

Released as a single, it reached number 32 on the Billboard Hot 100 as a double A-side with "I've Lost You".

The song was included on the album That's the Way It Is, released in November 1970.

Track listing

Charts

References

External links 
 
 You Don't Have to Say You Love Me / Patch It Up on the official Elvis Presley website

1970 songs
1970 singles
Elvis Presley songs
Songs written by Paul Evans (musician)